Qaimoh (also known as Quaimoh, Kaimoh or Kah moh) is a block, a town and a notified area committee in Kulgam District in the union territory of Jammu and Kashmir, India.  It is four miles to the west of Anantnag and six miles to the north of Kulgam District.  It is 55 km to the south of Srinagar city.  Qaimoh is one of the largest blocks in Jammu and Kashmir..

Demographics
According to 2011 Census of India, the city is the home of 13,138 individuals, which further divides into 6,681 males and 6,457 females.In 2022 it's home of (approx.) 30,000 individuals.

Geography
The area is located at an elevation of 1568 m above mean sea level. Qaimoh is situated on the bank of River Veshaw which has its origin from the lake of KousarNag some 25 kilometers away from the waterfall of Aharabal.

Transport
Anantnag railway station is the nearby railway station 3.9 km from the area

Holy shrine 
Kashmir is the land of saints, Sufis and Munis and Qaimoh Block, being part of the Kashmir Valley, is no exception. This place belongs to a famous saint, Sheikh-Ul-Alam. Sheikh-Ul-Alam was born and brought up in Qaimoh but was buried in Chari Sharief. He had spent most of his life in Qaimoh.

Trade and business 
Most of the population is agriculture and horticulture  dependent. Qaimoh is also known for exporting and importing of horticultural plants like apples, peaches, pears, apricot, plum etc to and from Himachal Pradesh. People from this block are well known for their business skills.  However, the literacy rate is little low (66%)[76% male and 57% female]. Qaimoh is a place where a lot of fresh as well as dry fruits are grown. The soil is said to be very fertile in this part of the valley but the place always has a threat of floods. River Vishew flows through the village and has damaged the crops of the village many a time.

References

Cities and towns in Kulgam district